The Mad Caddies (or the Caddies) are a ska punk band from Solvang, California, United States. The band formed in 1995 and has released seven full-length albums, one live album, and two EPs. To date, Mad Caddies have sold over 500,000 albums worldwide.

The Mad Caddies sound has influences from broad ranging genres including ska (especially ska 3rd wave), punk rock, hardcore punk, reggae, dixieland jazz, Latin music, polka, even cowpunk ("Crew Cut Chuck") and sea shanties ("Weird Beard").

History
Founding members Chuck Robertson, Sascha Lazor, Todd Rosenberg, and Carter Benson started the group while attending Santa Ynez Valley Union High School.  Robertson, Lazor, and Rosenberg are still current members, joined by Graham Palmer on bass, Eduardo Hernandez on trombone, and Mark Bush on trumpet.

In the band's early beginnings in the mid-1990s, they performed as Cracked Macaroni at Santa Ynez Valley Union High School. Shortly thereafter, the band played under the name The Ivy League, but in 1996 they changed their name after signing to the Honest Don's Records label to avoid confusion (and potential litigation) with two prior bands that went by the same moniker.  The band's debut album, Quality Soft Core, was released the following year. After the release of the album, the band was signed to Fat Mike's label Fat Wreck Chords, through which the Mad Caddies have released 6 studio albums, 2 EPs and a live album.  The Caddies have toured extensively throughout their career including tours across the USA, Europe, Japan, Canada, Mexico, South Africa, Australia, New Zealand and South America.  Their most recent full-length release, Punk Rocksteady, was released on June 15, 2018 and was produced by Fat Mike. In 2020 the Caddies released a 5 song EP titled "House on Fire" on Fat Wreck Chords. In 2022, the band toured Europe, with only Chuck Robertson being present and fill-in members completing the rest of the lineup. As of December 2022, Chuck Robertson is the only remaining permanent member of the band.

Discography
Studio albums
Quality Soft Core (1997)
Duck and Cover (1998)
Rock the Plank (2001)
Just One More (2003)
Keep It Going (2007)
Dirty Rice (2014)
Punk Rocksteady (2018)

EPs
The Holiday Has Been Cancelled (2000)
House on Fire (2020)

Live albums
Songs in the Key of Eh! (Live from Toronto) (2004)
Live @ Munich Backstage Germany 2007 (only 300 copies of this live DVD were made worldwide)

Compilations
Consentual Selections (2010)

Music Videos
 Road Rash (1998)
 Leavin' (2003)
 State of Mind (2007)
 Let it Go (2020)

Other projects
In 2008 Chuck Robertson started a side project, Ellwood, which featured Robertson on vocals and guitar, Graham Palmer on bass, Todd Rosenberg on drums, and Dustin Lanker on keys. The band was active from 2008 to 2012.

Former trumpet player Keith Douglas has been a member of Mariachi El Bronx since 2012, as well as King City with members of Lagwagon and RKL.

A project with former member Carter Benson (under the alias "Sharky Towers") called Jaws was released in 2006. Other members include Derrick Plourde and "Little" Joe Raposo. The release is called Death & Taxes Volume One and sounds significantly different than Mad Caddies.

Bassist Graham Palmer has fronted his solo project, Kinothek, since 2008. Since 2020 Palmer has also recorded as Redacted Choir alongside Jordan Dalrymple.

In 1999 Chuck Robertson, Sascha and Carter started a side project with Derrick Plourde called Sweet Action. Today their tracks are really hard to find. The band posted them during the late '90s on Mp3.com and today somebody has put them out on Youtube. Songs like "Did I tell you that I like Bad Religion" have a strong skate punk direction. The project was a pure Pop-Punk/skate punk project without any horns or ska elements. One of their tracks made it to the Happy Meals compilation series on My Records, which was owned by Joey Cape from Lagwagon.

In 2021, it was announced that Chuck Robertson would be releasing a new solo album under his own name.  He toured the next year backed by touring musicians.

Members

Current

Chuck Robertson - lead vocals, rhythm guitar (1995–present)
Brandon Landelius - lead guitar (2022–present)
Jon Gazi - Bass, Percussion (2007–present)
Sean Sellers - Drums (2022–present)

Past
Sascha Lazor - lead guitar, banjo (1995-2022)
Eduardo Hernandez - trombone (1996-2022)
Graham Palmer- bass guitar, vocals (2009-2022)
Todd Rosenberg- drums (1995-1999, 2010-2022)
Mark Bush - trumpet, backing vocals (2018-2022)
Keith Douglas - trumpet, vocals (1997-2016)
Carter Benson - guitar, vocals (1995-2002)
Dustin Lanker - keyboards (2007-2015)
Mark Iverson - bass (1995-2006)
Chris Badham - bass (2006-2008) (touring member)
Brian Flenniken - drums (2001-2008)
Boz Rivera - drums (2000-2001, 2008-2009)
Derrick Plourde - drums (2001)
Bobby "Moonbird" Vesnaver - trumpet (2014-2015) (touring member)
Jason "Wild Card" Lichau - trumpet (2015-2017) (touring member)
Chris Butcher – Trombone (2015) (touring member)

Timeline

References

External links
Mad Caddies official site
Interview With Sascha
Live at GreenSounds Festival, Bucharest 2016 (Gallery)

American ska punk musical groups
Musical groups established in 1995
Fat Wreck Chords artists
Musical groups from California
Third-wave ska groups